The 1987–88 Essex Senior Football League season was the 17th in the history of Essex Senior Football League, a football competition in England.

League table

The league featured 15 clubs which competed in the league last season, along with two new clubs:
Coggeshall Town, joined from the Reserve division
Woodford Town, resigned from the Southern Football League

League table

References

Essex Senior Football League seasons
1987–88 in English football leagues